Western Limited is a 1932 American drama film directed by Christy Cabanne and starring Estelle Taylor, Edmund Burns, and Lucien Prival. It was released on August 5, 1932.

Cast
 Estelle Taylor as Doris, the secretary
 Edmund Burns as Sinclair 
 Lucien Prival as Benoit 
 Gertrude Astor as Mrs. Winters
 Eddie Kane as Frank 
 James Burtis as Eddie 
 John Vosper as Bracy (credited as John Vosburgh)
 Mahlon Hamilton as Wilkes 
 Crauford Kent as James
 Adaline Asbury as Mrs. James

References

External links 
 
 
 

Films directed by Christy Cabanne
Monogram Pictures films
American drama films
1932 drama films
1932 films
American black-and-white films
1930s American films